Tamim Yahuza Shaban popularly known as TY Shaban or Shaba was a Nigerian singer, actor, dancer, TV Presenter, and film producer in the Northern Nigerian film industry popularly known as Kannywood.

Early life and  education 
Shaban was born on 4 February 1980 in the Nasarawa area of Nasarawa Local Government Area of Kano State, Nigeria. He attended Brigade Primary School, Junior Secondary School at Kano Teachers College and Senior Secondary School at Government Secondary School Stadium Duka in Kano. He studied Agriculture at the Federal College of Education (Technical) Bichi. He also studied Public Administration at Kano Polytechnic. He also did a Diploma in Film Production at Yusuf Maitama Sule University, Kano, both in Kano State. TY Shaban is a singer and filmmaker and producer at Northern Nigeria Cinema Kannywood. TY Shaban is the father of Sani TY Shaban (Freiiboi) a 16-year-old Hausa HIP-HOP singer from Northern Nigeria.

Music industry 
Shaban was first known in the field of Hausa Musics. His songs "Uwargida Ran Gida" and "Shaba zo Taho" are well-known because they have reached every part of Hausa land.

Film industry 
After his music career, Shaban became involved in the film industry, appearing in films and becoming a producer. In 2019, BBC Hausa placed Shaban's film in the Top Ten of Hausa movies.

References 

Nigerian musicians
Hausa-language singers
Living people
People from Kano State
Hausa people
Nigerian film producers
1980 births
Nigerian television presenters
Nigerian male film actors
Nigerian male singers
Kannywood actors
Male actors in Hausa cinema
Nigerian male dancers
Nigerian television personalities
Nigerian media personalities